The Chigoubiche Lake is the main freshwater body at the head of the Chigoubiche River (slope of the Ashuapmushuan River), flowing into the unorganized territory of Lac-Ashuapmushuan, Quebec, in the Regional County Municipality (MRC) Le Domaine-du-Roy, in the administrative region of Saguenay-Lac-Saint-Jean, in the province of Quebec, in Canada.

Located halfway between Saint-Félicien, Quebec and Chibougamau, Lake Chigoubiche is the largest body of water in the Ashuapmushuan Wildlife Reserve. This lake straddles the townships of Lorne, Bochart, Avaugour and Argenson.

The Canadian National Railway runs along the northeast shore of the lake. The route 167 linking Chibougamau to Saint-Félicien, Quebec passes on the northeast shore of the lake. A forest road bypasses the lake.

Forestry is the main economic activity of the sector. Recreational tourism activities come second.

The surface of Lake Chigoubiche is usually frozen from early November to mid-May, however safe ice circulation is generally from mid-November to mid-April.

Geography

Toponymy
During his 1732 expedition, surveyor Joseph-Laurent Normandin noted this toponym which derives from the Innu term "ushukupish", meaning "the place where les Betsis (Saw-Bees) brood". This toponym knows several graphic variants such as "Lake Chigobiche", "Lake Shecoubish" and "Ushukupis Shakahikan"; the latter form being the one used today by the Innus of Mashteuiatsh. From about 1950 to 1964, this body of water will be designated "Argenson Lake", after the name of the township where it is located.

At the time of Normandin, the region's Native people considered the river course and Chigoubiche Lake as the shortest way to reach the Ashuapmushuan Lake which is located a few kilometers farther west. According to his exploration notes, Normandin notes the abundance of furbearing animals in this area, including beavers, caribou, foxes and martens; hunters and traders frequenting this game region.

Today, in addition to still hunting in this territory, nature lovers also practice sport fishing, including pike and walleye.

The toponym "lac Chigoubiche" was formalized on December 5, 1968, by the Commission de toponymie du Québec.

Notes and references

See also 

Lakes of Saguenay–Lac-Saint-Jean
Le Domaine-du-Roy Regional County Municipality